Santo Antão ("Santo Antão" - Portuguese for Saint Anthony) is a district of the municipality of Santa Maria, in the Brazilian state of Rio Grande do Sul. It is situated in the north portion of Santa Maria. The district's seat is 11 km (6.84 miles) far from Downtown Santa Maria.

The district of Santo Antão owns an area of 51.33 km² that is equivalent to 8.86% of the municipality of Santa Maria that is 1791,65 km².

History 
The district was created in the year of 2001 by municipal law nº 4498/01 with territory separated from district of Boca do Monte.

Limits 

The district limits with the districts of Boca do Monte and Sede, and with the municipalities of Itaara and São Martinho da Serra

Neighbourhoods 
The district of Santo Antão is divided in the following bairros, that in English is equivalent to neighbourhoods:
 Santo Antão;

Roads and railway 
 In the district, the railway crosses in its south portion.
 There isn't highways in the district.

References

External links 
Site oficial da Prefeitura de Santa Maria

Districts of Santa Maria, Rio Grande do Sul